Dhanya Varma is an Indian journalist and talk show host currently hosting the Malayalam talk show The Happiness Project, on Kappa TV.

Personal life 
She hails from Thiruvalla. She is married to Cdr Vijay Varma, an officer in the Indian Navy and has 2 daughters and a son.

Education
She completed a master's degree in communication from Pune University in 2001.

Career 
She started her career with an internship at Star Plus after completing her studies, and later became an assistant producer on the TV show Kaun Banega Crorepati hosted by Amitabh Bachchan. She later hosted a talk show called Talking point on Rosebowl, which aired from 2009 - 2011. She also hosted the show Mammootty the Best Actor show on Asianet.
She was also a Hindi newsreader on Star News and has hosted a show called Wah! Cricket.
She also acted in the movie Humans of Someone directed by Sumesh Lal. The movie premiered at the International Film Festival of Kerala 2018. She is also the host of The Happiness Project with Dhanya Varma, with guests including celebrities and movie stars like Indrajith Sukumaran, Sunny Wayne, Lena, Anoop Menon, Industrialist Kochouseph Chittilappilly, Oncologist V. P. Gangadharan, Conservation photographer Balan Madhavan, Psychiatrist Dr. Manoj Kumar, Cinematographer Venu among others.

Filmography
 Humans of Someone (2018) as Alice
 Pathinettam Padi (2019) as Dhanu
 Sara's (2021) as Dr Sandhya Philip

References

Living people
People from Kerala
Indian television presenters
Year of birth missing (living people)
Actresses in Malayalam cinema